Jeff Hammerbacher is a data scientist. He was chief scientist and cofounder at Cloudera and later served on the faculty of the Icahn School of Medicine at Mount Sinai.

Early life
Hammerbacher grew up in Fort Wayne, Indiana. His father worked at the General Motors plant and his mother was a nurse. From an early age he had an interest in numbers.

Career
Prior to co-founding Cloudera, Hammerbacher led the data team at Facebook. Hammerbacher was an entrepreneur in residence at Accel Partners immediately prior to joining Cloudera. Hammerbacher worked as a quantitative analyst on Wall Street.

Hammerbacher has been featured for his work in Forbes, Fast Company, MIT Technology Review, Harvard Business Review, NY Times, Bloomberg BusinessWeek and others.

Selected publications

References 

Harvard University alumni
Data scientists
Year of birth missing (living people)
Living people
Place of birth missing (living people)
American company founders
Icahn School of Medicine at Mount Sinai faculty